The Fermanagh County Board of the Gaelic Athletic Association (GAA) or Fermanagh GAA is one of the 32 county boards of the GAA in Ireland and is responsible for the administration of Gaelic games in County Fermanagh, Northern Ireland.

The county football team reached an All-Ireland Senior Football Championship semi-final replay in 2004, its best performance in the competition.

Football

Clubs

Clubs contest the Fermanagh Senior Football Championship.

Fermanagh (22) has the second smallest number of clubs of any county in Ireland, behind Longford (21). 21 of the 22 offer football, while Lisbellaw St Patrick's offers hurling.

Fermanagh football clubs

County team

The county team has never won an Ulster Senior Football Championship (SFC) but has contested the final on six occasions: 1914, 1935, 1945, 1982, 2008 and 2018. Fermanagh is the only team in its province to have never won an Ulster SFC.

In Charlie Mulgrew's first season in charge, the county team reached the 2003 All-Ireland Senior Football Championship quarter-final after beating Meath and Mayo in the qualifiers. The team went to a replayed 2004 All-Ireland Senior Football Championship semi-final, beating Meath, Cork and Donegal and most memorably of all Armagh, thanks to a late point by Tom Brewster, before losing to Mayo.

Hurling
Clubs contest the Fermanagh Senior Hurling Championship.

Fermanagh's sole senior hurling club is St Patrick's Lisbellaw.

Fermanagh hurling clubs

Fermanagh has the following achievements in hurling.

All-Irelands (4) 

 All-Ireland Senior Hurling Championship: 0
 All-Ireland Junior Hurling Championship/Nicky Rackard Cup: 1
 Champions (1): 1994
 Runners-Up (1): 1977
 All-Ireland Junior B Hurling Championship/Lory Meagher Cups: 2
 Champions (2): 2015, 2021
 Runners-Up (3): 2012, 2014, 2020
 All-Ireland Minor C Championships: 1
 2009

Provincials (1) 

 Ulster Senior Hurling Championship: 0
 Ulster Junior Hurling Championships: 1
 1994

Leagues (3) 

 National Hurling League Division 4: 1
 1995
 National Hurling League Division 3 Shield: 1
 2007
National Hurling Division 3B: 1
 2022

Ladies' football
Fermanagh has a ladies' football team.

Camogie
Having been established in the 1920s, Camogie was revived in Fermanagh by Father Tom Maguire in 1939 around a base in Newtownbutler and they contested Ulster senior championship finals in the 1940s. Enniskillen contested the Féile na nGael camogie first division final in 1977 and Teemore won divisional honours in 1993, 1994 and 1995.

Under Camogie's National Development Plan 2010-2015, "Our Game, Our Passion", three new camogie clubs were to be established in Fermanagh and a county board formed by 2015.

References

External links

 Ourmanagh - Fermanagh Gaelic Games Fan Forum
 Fermanagh on Hoganstand.com
 National and provincial titles won by Fermanagh teams
 Club championship winners
 Fermanagh GAA site
 Up to date League tables for Club football in Fermanagh
 COME ON FERMANAGH - team support song, official site

 
Gaelic games governing bodies in Northern Ireland
Gaelic games governing bodies in Ulster